Megan Carmel Hollie Jossa is an English actress, known for portraying the role of Courtney Mitchell in BBC One soap opera EastEnders in 2006. She is the real life cousin of former EastEnders actress Jacqueline Jossa, who played Lauren Branning.

Career
Jossa played Courtney Mitchell in the BBC soap opera EastEnders from March to June 2006. Jossa has also appeared in a reconstruction on the ITV part life regression show, Have I Been Here Before?, The Bill, and played Amy in Coming of Age.

Jossa starred as Debbie in Billy Elliot the Musical at the Victoria Palace Theatre in the West End from 2008 until 30 May 2009 alongside British actor Tom Holland.

Awards
In 2006, Jossa was nominated for the best young actor award at the Inside Soap Awards.

Filmography

Theatre
 Billy Elliot (2008 - Victoria Palace Theatre, London)

References

External links
 

Year of birth missing (living people)
Living people
English child actresses
English soap opera actresses
21st-century English actresses
Actresses from London
People from Eltham